The 1992 Texas A&M Aggies football team represented Texas A&M University in the 1992 NCAA Division I-A football season.  The Aggies completed the season with a 12–1 record overall and a Southwest Conference mark of 7–0.

Schedule

Roster
RB Greg Hill
LB Daniel Horn
QB Corey Pulig
RB Rodney Thomas
CB Aaron Glenn
TE Greg Schorp

Game summaries

Stanford

LSU

Tulsa

Missouri

Texas Tech

Rice

Baylor

SMU

Louisville

Houston

TCU

Texas

Notre Dame

References

Texas AandM
Texas A&M Aggies football seasons
Southwest Conference football champion seasons
Texas AandM Aggies football